Thandava Murthy Muthu (born 21 January 1975) is an Indian male weightlifter, competing in the 56 kg category and representing India at international competitions. He participated at the 2000 Summer Olympics in the 56 kg event. He competed at world championships, most recently at the 2001 World Weightlifting Championships.

He received the Arjuna Award in 2002.

Major results

References

External links
 

1975 births
Living people
Indian male weightlifters
Weightlifters at the 2000 Summer Olympics
Olympic weightlifters of India
Place of birth missing (living people)
Weightlifters at the 2002 Asian Games
Weightlifters at the 2002 Commonwealth Games
Commonwealth Games medallists in weightlifting
Commonwealth Games silver medallists for India
Commonwealth Games bronze medallists for India
Recipients of the Arjuna Award
Asian Games competitors for India
20th-century Indian people
21st-century Indian people
Medallists at the 2002 Commonwealth Games